Jhansi Rly. Settlement is a town in Jhansi district in the Indian state of Uttar Pradesh.

Demographics
As of 2011 Indian Census, Jhansi Railway Settlement had a total population of 13,602, of which 7,226 were males and 6,376 were females. Population within the age group of 0 to 6 years was 1,168. The total number of literates in Jhansi Railway Settlement  was 10,754, which constituted 79.1% of the population with male literacy of 84.0% and female literacy of 74.4%. The effective literacy rate of 7+ population of Jhansi Railway Settlement  was 86.5%, of which male literacy rate was 92.1% and female literacy rate was 80.2%. The Scheduled Castes and Scheduled Tribes population was 3,373 and 38 respectively. Jhansi Railway Settlement  had 30460 households in 2011.

References

Cities and towns in Jhansi district